Khaled El-Moatamadawi is an Egyptian freestyle wrestler. He represented Egypt at the 2019 African Games held in Rabat, Morocco and he won one of the bronze medals in the men's freestyle 86 kg event. He is also a two-time gold medalist at the African Wrestling Championships.

Career 

At the 2019 African Wrestling Championships held in Hammamet, Tunisia, he won the gold medal in the 97 kg event. In 2020, he won the gold medal in the 86 kg event.

In 2021, he competed at the African & Oceania Olympic Qualification Tournament hoping to qualify for the 2020 Summer Olympics in Tokyo, Japan.

Achievements

References

External links 
 

Living people
Year of birth missing (living people)
Place of birth missing (living people)
Egyptian male sport wrestlers
African Games bronze medalists for Egypt
African Games medalists in wrestling
Competitors at the 2019 African Games
African Wrestling Championships medalists
21st-century Egyptian people